Valter Soosõrv (also Sooserv; 3 April 1903 in Vahastu – 26 June 1969 in Tallinn) is an Estonian actor, director and theatre historian.

In 1927 he graduated from the Drama Studio theatre school. 1922-1925 he was a choir singer at Estonia Theatre. 1925–1927 he played at Estonian Drama Studio Theatre, and 1927–1928 in Endla Theatre. 1932-1933 he was the head of Ugala Theatre. 1948-1951 he was the head of Estonian Theatre and Music Museum. Besides theatre roles he played also in several films.

Filmography
 1960: Näitleja Joller (television feature film)
 1961: Laulu sõber (feature film)
 1968: Libahunt (feature film)

References

1903 births
1969 deaths
Estonian male stage actors
Estonian male film actors
Estonian male television actors
Estonian male radio actors
20th-century Estonian male actors
Estonian theatre directors
People from Kuusalu Parish